Rynd may refer to:

People with the surname
James Alexander Porterfield Rynd (1846–1917) Irish chess player and lawyer
Francis Rynd (1801–1861), Irish physician, developer of hollow needle used in syringes

Other
Rynd, iron support used with millstones; see Millrind

See also
Rind (disambiguation)